Maximilian Karl Lamoral Graf O’Donnell von Tyrconnell (29 October 1812 — 14 July 1895) was an Austrian officer and civil servant who became famous when he helped save the life of  Emperor Franz Josef I of Austria. O'Donnell was a descendant of the Irish noble dynasty of O'Donnell of Tyrconnell.

Family background
He was born in Goldegg, son of Count Maurice O'Donnell (Moritz Graf O'Donnell) (1780–1843), the 7th generation descendant of Conn Oge O'Donnell, and Christine (4 January 1788 – 19 May 1867), the legitimate daughter of Charles Joseph, Prince de Ligne. He married Franziska Wagner, who was not of noble birth, and the marriage was frowned upon. He died in his home in Salzburg and is buried in the Salzburg Cemetery.

Military career
He was educated in Dresden, then joined the military and served in several engagements in Europe, including in Italy in 1848, and Hungary in 1849, resulting in many awards and promotion. He became aide-de-camp to the Emperor Franz Josef I of Austria.  He later served as Governor of Lombardy briefly from 18–22 March 1848.

Fame as life-saver

On 18 February 1853 Maximilian helped save the life of the young Emperor, foiling an assassination attempt by a tailor and former Hussar, János Libényi, a Hungarian nationalist. The Emperor was taking a stroll with Count Maximilian O’Donnell on a city-bastion, inside Vienna, and at about 1 pm. At the moment he looked over the parapet to review an exercise of troops, Libényi approached and struck the Emperor in the neck from behind with a knife. Even though the Emperor was wounded and bleeding, his collar may have helped save his life. Maximilian Graf O'Donnell struck Libényi down with his sabre. Another witness who happened to be nearby, the butcher Joseph Ettenreich, quickly overwhelmed Libényi. For this deed, he was later elevated to nobility by the Emperor and became Joseph von Ettenreich. Libényi was subsequently put on trial and condemned to death for attempted regicide. He was executed near the Spinnerin am Kreuz in the Favoriten-district.

After the unsuccessful attack the Emperor's brother Archduke Ferdinand Maximilian Joseph, the later Emperor of Mexico, called upon the royal families of Europe for donations to construct a new church on the site of the attack.  The church was to be a votive offering for the rescue of the Emperor. It is located on Ringstraße in the district of Alsergrund close to the University of Vienna, and is known as the Votivkirche.

Titles, honours and awards

Titles
Maximilian O’Donnell already held a German Habsburg title of Count, granted to his great-grandfather.  However, after successfully rescuing the Emperor, he was additionally honoured and made a Count of the Habsburg Austrian Empire (Reichsgraf), but an error occurred in the Letters Patent, omitting one “n” from the family name, and the Austrian O’Donnells have since then usually used “O’Donell” as the standard version.

Orders and decorations
 :
 Commander of the Imperial Order of Leopold, 1853
 Military Merit Cross
 Knight of Justice of the Order of Saint John of Jerusalem
  Ascanian duchies: Commander of the House Order of Albert the Bear, 2nd Class, 30 October 1852
 : Commander of the Order of the Zähringer Lion, 1st Class, 1852
 :
 Commander of the Merit Order of Saint Michael, 1850
 Commander of the Order of Merit of the Bavarian Crown, 1853
 : Commander of the Order of Leopold
 : Commander of the Order of the Southern Cross, with Star
    Ernestine duchies: Commander of the Saxe-Ernestine House Order, 1st Class, February 1853
  French Empire: Commander of the Legion of Honour
  Kingdom of Greece: Commander of the Order of the Redeemer
 : Commander of the Royal Guelphic Order, 2nd Class, 1853
  Electorate of Hesse: Commander of the Wilhelmsorden, 2nd Class, 26 November 1851
 : Commander of the Ludwig Order, 1st Class, 18 August 1853
  Holy See: Knight of the Supreme Order of Christ
 : Commander of the Sacred Military Constantinian Order of Saint George, 1852
 :
 Commander of the Royal Military Order of Saint Benedict of Aviz
 Commander of the Royal Military Order of the Tower and Sword
  Kingdom of Prussia:
 Knight of the Order of the Red Eagle, 2nd Class, 12 December 1852
 Commander's Cross of the Royal House Order of Hohenzollern, 8 March 1853
 :
 Knight of the Order of Saint Stanislaus, 1st Class with Star
 Knight of the Order of Saint Vladimir, 3rd Class
 Knight of the Order of Saint Anna, 2nd Class in Diamonds
 :
 Knight of the Saxon Order of Merit, 1849
 Commander of the Albert Order, 1st Class, 1853
 : Commander of the Order of Charles III, with Star
  Grand Duchy of Tuscany:
 Commander of the Order of Saint Joseph
 Knight of the Military Order of Saint Stephen
 : Commander of the Order of Saint George of the Reunion

Honours
 Freeman of the cities of Vienna, Prague, Pest, Laibach (Ljubljana), and others.

Arms
His customary O'Donnell arms were augmented by the initials and shield of the ducal House of Austria, with additionally the double-headed eagle of the Empire. These arms can still be seen emblazoned on the portico of no. 2 Mirabellplatz in Salzburg, where O'Donnell built his residence thereafter in the former gardens of Schloss Mirabell.

Descent from Niall of the Nine Hostages
 Maximilian Karl Lamoral O'Donnell
 Maurice Count O'Donnell
 Joseph Count O'Donnell
 Major-General Henry Count O'Donnell 
 Calbhach Dubh O'Donnell, of Oldcastle
 Colonel Calbhach Ruadh O'Donnell
 Colonel Manus O'Donnell
 Conn Oge O'Donnell
 Conn O'Donnell
 Calvagh O'Donnell, King of Tír Chonaill
 Manus O'Donnell, King of Tír Chonaill
 Hugh Dubh O'Donnell, King of Tír Chonaill
 Hugh Ruadh O'Donnell, King of Tír Chonaill
 Niall Garbh O'Donnell, King of Tír Chonaill
 Turlough an Fiona O'Donnell, King of Tír Chonaill
 Niall Garbh O'Donnell, King of Tír Chonaill
 Hugh O'Donnell, King of Tír Chonaill
 Domhnall Óg Ó Domhnaill, King of Tír Chonaill
 Donal Mór O'Donnell, King of Tír Chonaill
 Eignechan O'Donnell, King of Tír Chonaill
 Donnchadh O'Donnell
 Donal O'Donnell
 Hugh O'Donnell
 Tadg O'Donnell
 Conn O'Donnell
 Cathbharr O'Donnell
 Giollachriosd O'Donnell
 Cathbharr
 Domhnaill
 Eignechan
 Dálach
 Muirchertach
 Ceannfola
 Arnall
 Maolduin
 Ceannfola
 Garbh
 Ronan
 Lughach
 Fergus
 Seadnach
 Fergus Ceanfada
 Conall Gulban
 Niall of the Nine Hostages, High King of Ireland

Notes

References

External links
Vienna City Website with portraits of Emperor's Rescue

Counts of Austria
Austrian people of Irish descent
Wild Geese (soldiers)
1812 births
1895 deaths
Maximilian
People from St. Johann im Pongau District
Commandeurs of the Légion d'honneur
Commanders of the Order of Aviz
Recipients of the Order of Saint Stanislaus (Russian), 1st class
Recipients of the Order of St. Vladimir, 3rd class
Recipients of the Order of St. Anna, 2nd class
Knights Commander of the Order of Saint Joseph